Bowman Township is a township in Sullivan County, in the U.S. state of Missouri.

Bowman Township was erected in 1872, taking its name from the community of Bowmansville. The location of the extinct town of Bowmansville is unknown to the GNIS.

References

Townships in Missouri
Townships in Sullivan County, Missouri
Populated places disestablished in 2016